Jean Frances Herskovits (May 20, 1935 – February 5, 2019) was a research professor of history at the State University of New York at Purchase specializing in African (particularly Nigerian) history and politics. Herskovits taught at Brown University, Swarthmore College, City College of the City University of New York and Columbia University. She held a D. Phil. in African history from Oxford University.

Early life and education
Jean Frances Herskovits was born in Evanston, Illinois, on May 20, 1935, to anthropologists Melville J. Herskovits and Frances Shapiro Herskovits. She received her Bachelor of Arts degree from Swarthmore College in 1956, and her PhD from Oxford University in 1960, writing her dissertation on freed slaves who returned to Africa and the Lagos Colony.

Career
Jean Herskovits taught at Brown University, Swarthmore College, The City College of New York, and Columbia University. She was a professor at the State University of New York, Purchase, since 1977. Herskovits' thesis, "A Preface to Modern Nigeria: The Sierra Leonians in Yoruba," was written on a 1958 research trip to Nigeria and published in 1965.  She was a director of United Bank for Africa from  1998 to 2005 where she also chaired the Board of Trustees of the UBA Foundation. She also served as head of the Nigeria reinvestment project of Citizens Energy Corporation and from 2001 to 2008 was a member of Conoco Phillips’ Nigeria advisory council.

She wrote many articles about Nigeria in publications such as Foreign Policy and the New York Times.

Death
Herskovits died on February 5, 2019, in New York.

References

Historians of Africa
Historians of Yoruba
21st-century American historians
21st-century American women writers
Swarthmore College alumni
Swarthmore College faculty
Alumni of the University of Oxford
1935 births
Columbia University faculty
Brown University faculty
City College of New York faculty
People from Evanston, Illinois
American people of Slovak-Jewish descent
Jewish American historians
Historians of Nigeria
Historians from Illinois
2019 deaths
American women non-fiction writers
21st-century American Jews